The Vienna 1873 chess tournament was a side event of the world exhibition of 1873 (the fifth since the first Great Exhibition in London in 1851).

Background
The fair was held in the Prater in Vienna, and opened in the Rotunde on May 1.  Companies of all 35 participating countries presented their state of the art products and inventions. The world exhibitions aimed to promote international trading relations and to propagate the technical and cultural progress. Through this tournament, Austria-Hungary aimed to present itself as a world leader and the equal of England and France.

The Chess tournament
During the epidemic, the tournament took place in the rooms of the Wiener Schachgesellschaft from June 21 to August 29. The time limit was twenty moves per hour. It was a twelve player tournament. Each participant played every other for a match for two points with a maximum of three games. There were eleven rounds of match competitions. Every short match had to be ended within two days. If the overall score gave no winner (1:1,=1 or 0:0,=3), the result was drawn with a half point given to each player. Wilhelm Steinitz won the tournament after a play-off with Joseph Henry Blackburne (2–0). Almost everyone now conceded that Steinitz was the strongest chess player in the world.
 
Emperor Franz Josef I of Austria, Baron Albert Salomon von Rothschild and Baron Ignaz von Kolisch contributed large sums to the prize fund.

The results and standings:

{|class="wikitable" style="margin: 1em auto 1em auto; "
|  style="background:#f0f0f0;"|#
|  style="background:#f0f0f0;"|Player
|  style="background:#f0f0f0;"|1
|  style="background:#f0f0f0;"|2
|  style="background:#f0f0f0;"|3
|  style="background:#f0f0f0;"|4
|  style="background:#f0f0f0;"|5
|  style="background:#f0f0f0;"|6
|  style="background:#f0f0f0;"|7
|  style="background:#f0f0f0;"|8
|  style="background:#f0f0f0;"|9
|  style="background:#f0f0f0;"|10
|  style="background:#f0f0f0;"|11
|  style="background:#f0f0f0;"|12
|  style="background:#f0f0f0;"|Total
|  style="background:#f0f0f0;"|Final Total
|-
|1 ||  ||x ||1 1 ½ ||1 0 1 ||0 0 ½ ||1 1 0 ||1 1 ||1 1 ||1 1 0 ||1 1 ||1 1 0 ||1 ½ 1 ||0 1 1 ||21.5 ||10.0  
|-
|2 ||  ||0 0 ½ ||x ||1 1 ||1 1 ||1 1 ||1 1 ||1 1 ||½ ½ 1 ||½ ½ 1 ||1 1 ||1 1 ||1 1 ||20.5 ||10.0
|-
|3 ||  ||0 1 0 ||0 0 ||x ||1 0 1 ||1 1 ||1 0 1 ||1 0 1 ||0 ½ 1 ||½ 1 ½ ||1 1 0 ||1 1 ||1 ½ 1 ||19.0 ||8.5
|-
|4 ||  ||1 1 ½ ||0 0 ||0 1 0 ||x ||0 ½ 1 ||0 0 ||1 1 0 ||1 1 ||1 1 ||1 1 ||0 1 1 ||1 1 ||17.0 ||7.5
|-
|5 ||  ||0 0 1 ||0 0 ||0 0 ||1 ½ 0 ||x ||1 1 ||0 ½ 1 ||1 1 ||1 ½ 1 ||1 ½ 0 ||1 1 ||1 1 ||16.0 || 6.5
|-
|6 ||  ||0 0 ||0 0 ||0 1 0 ||1 1 ||0 0 ||x ||1 0 ½ ||1 1 ||1 1 ||1 1 ||1 1 ||1 1 ||14.5 || 6.5
|-
|7 ||  ||0 0 ||0 0 ||0 1 0 ||0 0 1 ||1 ½ 0 ||0 1 ½ ||x ||½ 1 0 ||0 1 ½ ||1 0 ½ ||½ 1 0 ||0 0 1 ||12.0 || 3.0
|-
|8 ||  ||0 0 1 ||½ ½ 0 ||1 ½ 0 ||0 0 ||0 0 ||0 0 ||½ 0 1 ||x ||1 0 1 ||0 1 ½ ||0 1 0 ||1 1 ||11.5 || 3.5
|-
|9 ||  ||0 0 ||½ ½ 0 ||½ 0 ½ ||0 0 ||0 ½ 0 ||0 0 ||1 0 ½ ||0 1 0 ||x ||½ 1 1 ||1 ½ ½ ||1 1 ||11.5 || 3.5 
|-
|10 ||  ||0 0 1 ||0 0 ||0 0 1 ||0 0 ||0 ½ 1 ||0 0 ||0 1 ½ ||1 0 ½ ||½ 0 0 ||x ||½ ½ ½ ||1 ½ ½ ||10.5 || 3.0
|-
|11 ||  ||0 ½ 0 ||0 0 ||0 0 ||1 0 0 ||0 0 ||0 0 ||½ 0 1 ||1 0 1 ||0 ½ ½ ||½ ½ ½ ||x ||½ 1 1 ||10.0 || 3.0
|-
|12 ||  ||1 0 0 ||0 0 ||0 ½ 0 ||0 0 ||0 0 ||0 0 ||1 1 0 ||0 0 ||0 0 ||0 ½ ½ ||½ 0 0 ||x ||5.0 || 1.0
|}

References

External links
Vienna 1873 Chess Games

Literature
Lehner, Hermann; Schwede, Constantin "Der Erste Wiener Internationale Schachkongreß im Jahre 1873", Verlag von Veit & Comp., Leipzig, 1874

Chess competitions
Chess in Austria
1873 in chess
1873 in Austria
1870s in Vienna
June 1873 sports events
July 1873 sports events
August 1873 sports events